Arvind Kumar, a 1984 (37RR) batch Assam-Meghalaya cadre IPS officer, is the former Director of the Intelligence Bureau. The Director of the Intelligence Bureau is the senior-most ranked IPS officer.

Kumar was appointed on June 26, 2019, as the 27th Director of Intelligence Bureau succeeding Rajiv Jain. Arvind Kumar has been working with the IB since 1991. He is a recipient of the President's Police Medal for Distinguished Service and consistent performance

See also
 Indian Police Service

References

Indian police officers
Living people
Directors of Intelligence Bureau (India)
Alumni of the Netarhat Residential School
1959 births